Volodymyr Ivanovych Linke (born 27 March 1958 in Kharkiv) is a former professional football forward who played in his native city for FC Metalist Kharkiv and FC Olimpik Kharkiv.

In 2016, he became one of initiators who organized a corporation Avanhard Kharkiv that registered the revived FC Metalist 1925 Kharkiv.

External links
Player profile

Shevchenko, L. Volodymyr Linke: Lifelong citizen of Kharkiv. Metalist Kharkiv stats website.

1958 births
Living people
Ukrainian footballers
Soviet footballers
Footballers from Kharkiv
Association football forwards
Soviet Top League players
FC Metalist Kharkiv players
FC Olympik Kharkiv players
FC APK Morozovsk players
FC Naftovyk-Ukrnafta Okhtyrka players
Ukrainian expatriate footballers
Expatriate footballers in Russia
Ukrainian expatriate sportspeople in Russia